David Anderson (born July 30, 1962) is a Canadian former professional ice hockey player.

Playing career
Anderson attended the University of Denver where he played four seasons (1981 – 1985) of NCAA Division I hockey with the Denver Pioneers, scoring 56 goals and 71 assists for 127 points, while earning 198 penalty minutes, in 150 games played.

Anderson commenced his professional career with the 1985-86 Fort Wayne Komets of the International Hockey League. On August 6, 1986, he was signed as a free agent by the New Jersey Devils of the National Hockey League. As a member of the Devils' organization, Anderson as assigned to play with their American Hockey League affiliate, the Maine Mariners, for the 1986–87 season, and then with the Utica Devils for the 1987–88 season.

Anderson went overseas to play with the Durham Wasps of the British Hockey League before hanging up his skates following the 1988-89 season.

Career statistics

References

External links

1962 births
Living people
Bellingham Blazers players
Canadian ice hockey right wingers
Denver Pioneers men's ice hockey players
Durham Wasps players
Fort Wayne Komets players
Ice hockey people from Vancouver
Maine Mariners players
Nanaimo Clippers players
Utica Devils players
Canadian expatriate ice hockey players in England
Canadian expatriate ice hockey players in the United States